West Lake Hills (locally referred to as "Westlake") is a city in Travis County, Texas, United States. The population was 3,444 at the 2020 census. The city developed rapidly in the 1970s and 1980s on the south side of the Colorado River.

It is a suburb of Austin, located just west of central Austin.

Demographics

As of the 2020 United States census, there were 3,444 people, 1,193 households, and 1,002 families residing in the city.

As of the census of 2000, there were 3,116 people, 1,143 households, and 873 families residing in the city. The population density was 835.7 people per square mile (322.5/km2). There were 1,185 housing units at an average density of 317.8 per square mile (122.7/km2). The racial makeup of the city was 95.60% White, 0.29% African American, 0.29% Native American, 1.28% Asian, 0.71% from other races, and 1.83% from two or more races. Hispanic or Latino of any race were 3.85% of the population.

There were 1,143 households, out of which 40.0% had children under the age of 18 living with them, 69.0% were married couples living together, 5.2% had a female householder with no husband present, and 23.6% were non-families. 17.5% of all households were made up of individuals, and 6.0% had someone living alone who was 65 years of age or older. The average household size was 2.71 and the average family size was 3.10.

In the city, the population was spread out, with 28.1% under the age of 18, 4.3% from 18 to 24, 22.1% from 25 to 44, 35.5% from 45 to 64, and 10.1% who were 65 years of age or older. The median age was 43 years. For every 100 females, there were 100.0 males. For every 100 females age 18 and over, there were 97.3 males.

The median income for a household in the city of West Lake Hills was $116,905, and the median income for a family was $232,913. Males had a median income of $116,371 versus $43,969 for females. The per capita income for the city was $55,651. About 0.6% of families and 2.0% of the population were below the poverty line, including 1.8% of those under age 18 and none of those age 65 or over. In June 2010, the average home price was $1,225,697.

Education
West Lake Hills is the only city completely within the Eanes Independent School District. Residents are zoned to Eanes Elementary School, Bridge Point Elementary School, Barton Creek Elementary School, Cedar Creek Elementary School, Forest Trail Elementary School, Valley View Elementary School, Hill Country Middle School, West Ridge Middle School, and Westlake High School.

References

External links
 City of West Lake Hills
 

Cities in Travis County, Texas
Cities in Texas
Cities in Greater Austin